The Indian vine snake or long-nosed vine snake (Ahaetulla oxyrhyncha) is a species of diurnal, mildly venomous, arboreal snake distributed in the lowlands of peninsular India.Often mistakenly believed to peck out peoples' eyes, this misconception has, sadly, led to widespread wanton killing of this species.

Description 
A thin and slender-bodied snake that is usually bright grassy green in colour. A pair of white lines extend throughout its body length demarcating the back and under belly parts. Adults reach over 5 feet in length. They have unique horizontal pupil in the eye. Formerly mis-classified asA. nasuta, A. oxyrhyncha is actually a much larger-bodied species  that also has a much longer snout.

Geographic range 
This species is distributed throughout the drier plains and low hilly tracts of Peninsular India, except the Western Ghats rainforest.

Habitat 
It is found in many types of vegetation including arid to semi-arid habitats and in dry deciduous forests, as well as open areas such as scrub forests, coastal forests, and Indian savannah. This species has been often sighted in and around human habitations in villages and countrysides and even in some city Parks.

Taxonomy 
It was described as a distinct species in 1825 based on drawings of snakes from Vishakapatnam, but later considered as same species and confused with A. nasuta, that is only endemic to Sri Lanka. A 2020 study found A. nasuta to be a species complex of A. nasuta sensu stricto and several species endemic to the Western Ghats (A. borealis, A. farnsworthi, A. isabellina, and A. malabarica).

References 

oxyrhyncha
Reptiles of India
Endemic fauna of India
Snakes of Asia
Reptiles described in 1825